Bridelia tenuifolia is a tree in the family Phyllanthaceae.  It is native to southern Africa (Angola and Namibia).

References

tenuifolia
Plants described in 1864
Flora of Southern Africa
Taxa named by Johannes Müller Argoviensis